What If... is a 2010 drama film directed by Dallas Jenkins and starring Kevin Sorbo, John Ratzenberger, Kristy Swanson and Debby Ryan. The film was released in theaters on August 20, 2010. It is the first film in a two-film partnership between Jenkins Entertainment and Pure Flix Entertainment.

Plot

When Ben Walker (Kevin Sorbo) was young, he left his girlfriend Wendy (Kristy Swanson) and his hometown for a business opportunity. 15 years later he has a high-paying career and a trophy fiancée when he is visited by Mike (John Ratzenberger), an angel who gives him a glimpse into how his life would look had he followed his original plan. After that experience, Ben awakens from a coma, gives up his fiancée, and tries to reunite with Wendy. After 8 years they celebrate Kimberly's birthday.

Cast
 Kevin Sorbo as Ben Walker
 Kristy Swanson as Wendy Walker
 Debby Ryan as Kimberly "Kim" Walker
 Taylor Groothuis as Megan Walker
 John Ratzenberger as Mike, the Angel
 Kristin Minter as Cynthia
 Toni Trucks as Claire
 Stelio Savante as Joel Muller
 Kevin Yon as Charlie
 Tom McElroy as James McCutcheon
 Grant James as Henryk Zimmerman

Production 
What If... was filmed June 28–July 14, 2009, mostly in Manistee, Michigan at 10 West Studios, with some filming done in Grand Rapids, Michigan. Jenkins Entertainment is owned by Jerry B. Jenkins and operated by his son Dallas Jenkins. Jerry served as executive producer and Dallas directed. Pure Flix Entertainment produced and supervised marketing and distribution.

Release 
What If...  was screened at the Christian Writer's Guild conference in Denver, Colorado. The audience, which included Jerry B. Jenkins and his wife, gave the film a standing ovation.

Response 
Kevin Sorbo won the Grace Award for Movies for his work in What If... at the 2011 Movieguide Awards.

See also
 List of films about angels

References

External links 
 
 
 

10 West Studios films
2010 films
Films about evangelicalism
Films about wish fulfillment
Films shot in Michigan
2010 independent films
Pure Flix Entertainment films
Films produced by Russell Wolfe
Films produced by David A. R. White
Films about angels
2010s English-language films